The following is a partial list of the "D" codes for Medical Subject Headings (MeSH), as defined by the United States National Library of Medicine (NLM).

This list covers bacterial proteins. For other protein-related codes, see List of MeSH codes (D12.776).

Codes before these are found at List of MeSH codes (D12.776) § MeSH D12.776.093. Codes following these are found at List of MeSH codes (D12.776.124). For other MeSH codes, see List of MeSH codes.

The source for this content is the set of 2006 MeSH Trees from the NLM.

– bacterial proteins

– arac transcription factor

– azurin

– bacterial capsules

– bacterial outer membrane proteins

– adhesins, bacterial
 – adhesins, escherichia coli

– bacterial transferrin receptor complex
 – transferrin-binding protein a
 – transferrin-binding protein b

– fimbriae proteins

– bacterial transferrin receptor complex

– bacteriocins

– cloacin

– megacins

– nisin

– pyocins

– botulinum toxins

– botulinum toxin type a

– cell wall skeleton

– coagulase

– colicins

– escherichia coli proteins

– adhesins, escherichia coli

– colicins

– exfoliatins

– factor for inversion stimulation protein

– ferredoxins

– molybdoferredoxin

– rubredoxins

– flagellin

– flavodoxin

– groel protein

– groes protein

– integration host factors

– host factor 1 protein

– luciferases, bacterial

– muts dna mismatch-binding protein

– penicillin-binding proteins

– periplasmic proteins

– periplasmic binding proteins

– rna polymerase sigma 54

– staphylococcal protein a

– streptavidin

– tetanus toxin

– zinostatin

The list continues at List of MeSH codes (D12.776.124).

D12.776.097